Thuiappuarachchi Don Daya de Alwis (born 7 November 1942 – died 27 April 2015 as දයා අල්විස්) [Sinhala]), popularly known as Daya Alwis, was an actor in Sri Lankan cinema, stage drama and television. He was also a screenwriter and director. He directed about six teledramas. He was the first person in Sri Lanka to receive an award covering all three areas - Stage Drama, Cinema and Teledrama.

He died on 27 April 2015 at the age of 72, while receiving treatment after an accident.

Personal life
Daya Alwis was born on 7 November 1942 in Payagala as the fourth son of the family with seven siblings. He completed his education from Kalutara Vidyalaya. In 1956 at the age of 14, he sang the song Laa Dalu Wanamal. After finishing Bhathkande degree, he entered to Tholangamuwa Central College as the music teacher. He made his first drama, Girikuta, at the school.

He was married to Yamuna Dayangani and they had two sons - Sarangadeva and Sapumal Bandara.

Acting career
Before entering acting, Alwis traveled to India in 1964 to study music in Bhatkhande Music Institute Deemed University and worked as a sound mixer for on stage events. In 1966, he produced his first film. He started acting career with stage dramas, Depano, Modara Mola, Ekadhipathi, Kaluware Jaramare, Ran Kanda, such as Sarathchandra's Premathi Jayathi Soko and Kalu Walalu, Gunasena Galapththi's Muhudu Puttu, Henry Jayasena's Makarã Saha Gamanak, Dharmasiri Bandara's Kakarasaya, Dawala Beehishana, Somalatha Subasinghe's Vikurthi and Jayantha Chandrasiri's Môra. His own production Dalpadadu was shown on 6 and 13 October in Sweden and again in October at Harrow and later at the University of London, Westminster. His stage drama Parasthawa also played in London and Birmingham. Some of stage dramas he directed include Aganthukayo and K Sara. He is the screenplay writer and assistant director for the film Sinhabahu.

Television career
Alwis is one of the earliest pillars of Sinhala teledrama history. He made history as the first person who wrote and acted in the very first drama, La Hiru Dahasak, which was televised, in Sri Lankan television. He also wrote screenplay for the dramas Awarjanaa, Punarawarthana and Bodima. His maiden teledrama direction came through Chandra Yamaya. He acted in the critically acclaimed serial Weda Hamine and then on Chandrayamaya. His most popular television acting came through the Bodima and Paba television serials. He also starred in Ira Bata Taruwa, the first Sri Lankan teledrama filmed in London. In 2001, he directed the serial Awasan Horawa telecast on ITN channel every Friday at 7.30 p.m. from January 5.

Television serials

 Awarjanaa
 Awasan Horawa
 Bhagya
 Bodima
 Chandrayamaya
 Gal Pilimaya Saha Bol Pilimaya
 Ganga ha Nissanka
 Hikmiya
 Hiruta Muwawen
 Ira Batu Tharuwa
 Kokila Wilapaya
 Kota Uda Mandira
 La Hiru Dahasak
 Makara Vijithaya
 Manmulawu Mama
 Nirsathwayo
 Niwataya
 Paba
 Parasathu Malak
 Pathok Palama
 Pinsara Dosthara
 Pitagamkarayo
 Punarawarthana
 Samanala Gamanak 
 Sandagalathenna 
 Sathya
 Sathyaya 
 Siri Sirimal
 Vasudha 
 Wanasarana
 Wassana Sihinaya 
 Weda Hamine

Death
On 20 April 2015 he met with an accident at Bokundara, Piliyandala with a threewheel. He went home without any medications as no any external bleeding had taken place. However, internal bleeding had occurred and his head had received a contusion in the accident. He was then rushed to the Sri Jayawardenapura Hospital. He underwent treatment at Neurological Unit for severe bleeding in his brain. He died on 27 April around 3.50am, due to internal bleeding while receiving treatment at the hospital.

Filmography
Alwis started his film career with Amarnath Jayatilaka's 1976 film Thilake Ha Thilaka. Then he acted in more than 40 films. Some of his popular cinema acting came through Kolamba Sanniya, Madol Duwa, Sarungalaya, Pooja, Maya as well as Wasantha Obeysekara’s Walmathwuwo, where he was nominated for national awards.
 
 No. denotes the Number of Sri Lankan film in the Sri Lankan cinema.

References

External links
 Chat with Daya Alwis

Sri Lankan male film actors
Sinhalese male actors
1942 births
2015 deaths
Sri Lankan male television actors
Sri Lankan male stage actors
Sri Lankan theatre directors
Road incident deaths in Sri Lanka